Despite It All is a Country Rock album by pub rock band Brinsley Schwarz, released in 1970.

Track listing
All songs are written by Nick Lowe except where specified 
 "Country Girl"  – 3:10
 "The Slow One"  – 5:33
 "Funk Angel"  – 4:21
 "Piece of Home" (Bob Andrews) – 6:19 
 "Love Song"  – 4:10
 "Star Ship"  – 2:40
 "Ebury Down"  – 5:15
 "Old Jarrow"  – 7:11

Personnel
Brinsley Schwarz
 Brinsley Schwarz	 - 	guitar, vocals
 Billy Rankin	 - 	drums, percussion, Good vibes
 Bob Andrews	 - 	keyboards, guitar, bass, vocals
 Nick Lowe	 - 	bass, guitar, banjo, vocals
Additional performers (credited as 'Superb Beauties')
 Dave Jackson - saxophone on "The Slow One" and "Funk Angel"
 Willy Weider - fiddle on "Country Girl"
 Brian Cole - pedal steel on "Star Ship"

References

Brinsley Schwarz albums
1970 albums
Capitol Records albums
Albums produced by Brinsley Schwarz (musician)
Albums produced by Billy Rankin (drummer)
Albums produced by Bob Andrews (keyboardist)
Albums produced by Nick Lowe
albums recorded at Olympic Sound Studios